William Waller Hening (1768–1828) was a 19th-century attorney, legal scholar, publisher and politician during the formative years of the United States. He was a contemporary of many founding fathers, including Thomas Jefferson, John Marshall and James Monroe.

Hening published a wide variety of law books that were among the most read of his time.

Hening is best known for his important role codifying the law in Virginia. At the time, Virginia was the largest of the original thirteen colonies, which produced four of the first five U.S. Presidents.

When assembling the primary authorities for his work, Hening borrowed from Thomas Jefferson's personal book collection to track down early sources of Virginia law. His published statutory codifications are routinely cited by historians and genealogists.

The Virginia General Assembly authorized Hening's work to allow public access for the first time to all early statutes that had previously only been available in rare publications and abridgments. As such, Hening's work "immediately became, and remains, an essential source for all researchers working on colonial and Revolutionary Virginia history".

In 1789 Hening was admitted to the practice of law in the city of Fredericksburg together with John Marshall and James Monroe. Before beginning his political career, Hening assisted with the restoration of county records that had been destroyed by the British during the Revolutionary War.

Hening was appointed by Thomas Jefferson as a Federal Commissioner of Bankruptcy for Virginia. He represented Albemarle County in the Virginia House of Delegates (1804–05), served on the Virginia Council of State (1805–10), and was Deputy Adjutant General (1808–14). He served as clerk of the Superior Court of Chancery for the Richmond District beginning in 1810 until his death in 1828.

Hening's first important work was the New Virginia Justice (Richmond, 1795; Sowerby, no. 1971). The audience for this publication was not only local justices of the peace, but also lawyers and other officials.  The New Virginia Justice was a handbook for justices of the peace which incorporated Virginia laws and forms dating back to the Revolution and included new magistrate duties under federal law. Thomas Jefferson was a subscriber and commended the book as "a work of great utility for the public". It has been suggested that Hening may have realized that a new guide for magistrates was need when he first qualified for the bar in 1789.

Perhaps his most famous work is Hening's edition of The Statutes at Large; being a Collection of all the Laws of Virginia. The work is a well researched 13 volume magnum opus of legal scholarship that codified the Commonwealth of Virginia's laws from 1619–1792, along with an extensive appendix. The 13 volumes are cited collectively as William Waller Hening, The Statutes at Large; Being a Collection of All the Laws of Virginia, from the first session of the Legislature in the year 1619, 13 vols. (Richmond, Philadelphia, and New York, 1809-1823).

Between 1794 and 1826 Hening published four editions of the New Virginia Justice, a two volume American pleading guide, American editions of three English works on legal maxims and precedents, four volumes of court reports, including the first advance sheet system in Virginia; and the thirteen volume set of Virginia's laws. Additionally, he published pamphlets and assisted with the preparation of the Virginia Code, making him the most prolific legal writer of his time. During this period, Hening published one scholarly or legal publication per year, on average.

References 

Virginia lawyers
1768 births
1828 deaths
19th-century American lawyers